The 1981–82 Soviet League Season was the 36th year of competition in the Soviet Championship League. CSKA Moscow won the championship, its 6th in a row and 25th overall.

First round

Final round

5th-8th place

Relegation

External links
Season on hockeystars.ru

1981–82 in Soviet ice hockey
Soviet League seasons
Sov